Cheilotoma erythrostoma is a species of leaf beetles from the subfamily Cryptocephalinae. It can be found in Bulgaria, Italy, Romania, in Crimea, in the south of Russia and the Caucasus. It can also be found in Czech Republic and Slovakia.

Subspecies
Cheilotoma erythrostoma ab. italica
Cheilotoma erythrostoma erythrostoma

References

Clytrini
Beetles described in 1837
Taxa named by Franz Faldermann
Beetles of Europe